Taihe Institute, otherwise known as Taihe or TI, is an independent, non-profit think tank founded in 2013. Based in Beijing, China, and with a regional center in Europe, the organization conducts research on international relations, economics, science and technology, culture and education, and ethics and religion. In addition, Taihe leads several research programs on public policy, de-carbonization, green finance, public health, and criminal law.

Notable Scholars 
Notable current and former Taihe scholars include:

 Charles Liu, Co-Founder of Impact Asia Capital Ltd and Advisory Board Member of CGN Capital Partners Infrastructure Fund III;
 Einar Tangen, CGTN current affairs commentator and founder of Asia Narratives;

Activities

Taihe Civilizations Forum 
The Taihe Civilizations Forum (TCF), launched in 2017, is an annual event organized by the Taihe Institute, with the aim of supporting “the harmonious development of common values and the advancement of human civilization.”

Seminars and Events 
Taihe organizes regular seminars and meetings with foreign embassies, chambers of commerce in China, and academic and business institutions. 

Taihe has conducted seminars with the Embassy of Israel in China, the Embassy of Peru in China, the Embassy of Ethiopia in China, the Embassy of Spain in China, the Embassy of Greece in China, the Embassy of Singapore in China, the Embassy of Colombia in China, the Embassy of Pakistan in China, the Embassy of Iran in China, and the Embassy of the UK in China. 

Taihe has participated in meetings with officials from the British Chamber of Commerce in China, the American Chamber of Commerce in China, and the European Union Chamber of Commerce in China, the National Committee on American Foreign Policy (NCAFP), etc.

The “China-France Dialogue for the Future” is a feature seminar regularly hosted by the Taihe Institute, together with the Alumni Association of China of the French National School of Administration (now the French National Institute of Public Service), and the French National Research Institute for Agriculture, Food and Environment.

Publications 
Taihe as a think tank produces TI Library (《太和文库》), a collection of its researchers’ findings.

Taihe also produces a monthly English publication – TI Observer, which invites policy makers, diplomats, industry experts, and thought leaders to share their insights on trending global issues. TI Observer vol. 6 (Olympics and Diplomacy) is collected in the Olympic World Library of the Olympic Research Center under the International Olympic Committee. TI Observer vol. 21 (Non-Alignment 2.0) is referred by the American magazine Foreign Policy in its analysis of non-alignment theory.

In March 2019, “General Xue Lectures on Sun Tzu's Art of War,” authored by Xue Guo’an, a senior fellow of the Taihe Institute, and the first book listed under the “Taihe Institute Book Series,” was published by the CITIC Press Group.

COVID-19 disinformation 

In August 2021, Taihe Institute, together with the Intelligence & Alliance Think Tank, published a report titled “U.S. Responsible for Global Spread of COVID-19.”

References

External links 
 
Economy of China
Research institutes in China
Organizations established in 2013
2013 establishments in China
Organizations based in Beijing
China-focused think tanks
Foreign policy and strategy think tanks in China